Bay City is a city in Matagorda County, Texas, United States. The population was 17,614 at the 2010 census and 18,061 at the 2020 census.  It is the county seat of Matagorda County. The current mayor is Robert Nelson.

Geography

Bay City was formerly named "Bay Prairie", as the natural ecosystems that surround the town are prairies crisscrossed by creeks that lead into the bay.

Climate
The climate in this area is characterized by hot, humid summers and generally mild to cool winters.  According to the Köppen Climate Classification system, Bay City has a humid subtropical climate, abbreviated "Cfa" on climate maps.

Demographics

As of the 2020 United States census, there were 18,061 people, 6,602 households, and 4,086 families residing in the city.

As of the census of 2000, 18,667 people, 6,912 households, and 4,769 families resided in the city. The population density was 2,196.0 people per square mile (847.9/km2). There were 8,113 housing units at an average density of 954.4 per square mile (368.5/km2). The racial makeup of the city was 61.62% White, 17.26% African American, 0.74% Native American, 0.88% Asian, 0.07% Pacific Islander, 16.84% from other races, and 2.59% from two or more races. Hispanics or Latinos of any race were 34.74% of the population.

Of the 6,912 households, 37.9% had children under the age of 18 living with them, 49.0% were married couples living together, 16.1% had a female householder with no husband present, and 31.0% were not families. About 27.1% of all households were made up of individuals, and 10.5% had someone living alone who was 65 years of age or older. The average household size was 2.66 and the average family size was 3.25.

In the city, the population was distributed as 30.9% under the age of 18, 9.8% from 18 to 24, 28.2% from 25 to 44, 20.0% from 45 to 64, and 11.1% who were 65 years of age or older. The median age was 32 years. For every 100 females, there were 95.0 males. For every 100 females age 18 and over, there were 91.1 males.

The median income for a household in the city was $30,446, and for a family was $39,281. Males had a median income of $38,202 versus $23,058 for females. The per capita income for the city was $15,284. About 18.3% of families and 21.4% of the population were below the poverty line, including 27.7% of those under age 18 and 14.3% of those age 65 or over. Minorities make up the largest ethnic portion of Bay City, Texas.

Economy
In 2017, Bay City became the site of a new $1.8-billion Tenaris seamless-pipe mill, making tubular goods, such as drill pipe and casing, for the oil-drilling industry.

Bay City formerly housed the headquarters of Stanley Stores. The chain made several donations to the Bay City Museum.

Attractions
Bay City is home to the Matagorda County Birding Nature Center, a  expanse of gardens and wildlife along the Colorado River of Texas.

Other attractions include the Matagorda County Museum, Market Days every 3rd Saturday, and a variety of small shops and boutiques downtown. The Bay City Art League, also located here, has recently undergone major renovations and is currently working to revitalize the art scene in Matagorda County. In addition, the Bay City Community Theatre group (CAST) regularly produces shows at various local venues.

Education
Bay City is served by the Bay City Independent School District, consisting of elementary, intermediate, junior high, and high schools (including Bay City High School). The district previously operated seven schools until grade levels were condensed.  It is now operating five schools and is led by superintendent Dr. Marshall Scott III.

The designated community college for Bay City ISD is Wharton County Junior College. It has a campus in Bay City, focusing on technical training and nuclear plant operations.

Infrastructure

Health care
Matagorda County is served by the Matagorda Regional Medical Center, and the mission-aligned Matagorda Medical Group. The Matagorda Episcopal Health Outreach Program (MEHOP), the county's only federally qualified health center, offers Family Medical, OB/Gyn, Pediatrics, Behavior Health, and Dentistry services. MEHOP accepts most insurances and assures that no patient will be denied or unable to access health care services due to an individual's inability to pay.

Government

Notable people

 Charles Austin, Olympic gold medalist
 Forrest Bess, artist
 Robert Blackmon, professional football player
 David Caldwell, professional football player
 J. B. Cox, professional baseball player
 Joe DeLoach, Olympic gold medalist during the Seoul Olympics
 Mark Dennard, professional football player
 Alex Dixon, professional soccer player
 Hart Lee Dykes, professional football player
 Simon Fletcher, professional football player
 Ronnie Heard, professional football player
 Quentin Jammer, professional football player
 Chandi Jones, professional basketball player
 Greg Laughlin,  U.S. Representatives from Texas's 14th district
 C. Wallis Ohl, Jr., retired Provisional Bishop of Fort Worth
 Ricardo Ramírez, Roman Catholic Bishop
 Tracy Simien, professional football player
 Mal Whitfield, Olympic gold medalist
 Cedric Woodard, professional football player

In popular culture
Part of the 1965 movie Baby the Rain Must Fall was filmed in Bay City.

Terrence Malick's The Tree of Life gathered locals to be extras for filming at Matagorda Beach.

Churches

References

External links

 Bay City in Handbook of Texas

Cities in Texas
Cities in Matagorda County, Texas
County seats in Texas
Micropolitan areas of Texas